Giany Joinville (born 1 July 1984 in Saint-Claude) is a French former professional footballer who played as a defender.

He played on the professional level in Ligue 2 for FC Gueugnon and AC Ajaccio.

External links
 
 
 

1984 births
Living people
Association football defenders
French footballers
Ligue 2 players
Louhans-Cuiseaux FC players
FC Gueugnon players
AC Ajaccio players
FC Libourne players
ÉFC Fréjus Saint-Raphaël players
SO Romorantin players
Bourges 18 players